Jefferson Health - Northeast also known as Aria-Jefferson Health (formerly called Frankford Health Systems, now part of Jefferson Health) is a healthcare system in Northeast Philadelphia and Lower Bucks County. It consists of three hospitals and a number of outpatient clinics with a total of 855 beds. In July 2016, Aria and Jefferson Health System announced an official merger.

Jefferson Frankford Hospital

The Frankford campus, now known as Jefferson Frankford Hospital, opened on July 4, 1903.  The Frankford campus is a general medical and surgical hospital with 115 beds.  In the last year with data available, the hospital had 131,188 emergency department visits, and performed 7,686 inpatient and 11,561 outpatient surgeries.

Jefferson Torresdale Hospital

In 1977, the Torresdale campus, now known as Jefferson Torresdale Hospital, opened in northeast Philadelphia. It is a 258-bed hospital, and a Level II trauma center. The Torresdale campus has a 1,300 car parking garage.  There are also partner urgent care clinics in the Torresdale area.

Work began in 2013 for a new emergency department and parking garage at the Torresdale campus, at a cost of $37 million. The expansion increased the size of the emergency department to 42 beds. Jefferson Torresdale Hospital in Philadelphia, Pa. is rated high performing in 2 adult procedures and conditions, according to U.S. News & World Report. It is a general medical and surgical facility. It scored high in patient safety, demonstrating commitment to reducing accidents and medical mistakes.

Jefferson Bucks Hospital

In 1999, the Aria Health system acquired Delaware Valley Medical Center, which is now called Jefferson Bucks Hospital. It is a 112-bed hospital located in Langhorne, Pennsylvania.

Aria Health sought to build a new 229-bed facility in Lower Makefield to replace Bucks County Hospital. Local residents opposed this project, due to concerns about traffic congestion. In 2013, Aria Health proposed news plans for a "health care village," a facility offering multiple health care services, which may have lower impact on the environment and traffic congestion.

Graduate medical education

Jefferson Health Northeast operates a number of osteopathic residency programs accredited by the American Osteopathic Association.  Jefferson Health Northeast hosts residency programs in family medicine, internal medicine, emergency medicine, and podiatric surgery,  including two combined residency programs: one in internal and emergency medicine and another in family and emergency medicine.

Jefferson Health Northeast also runs a critical care fellowship program.

See also
 List of hospitals in Philadelphia, Pennsylvania

References

External links
 
 PHCQA Report of Hospital Quality

Teaching hospitals in Pennsylvania
Northeast Philadelphia
Healthcare in Philadelphia
Hospital networks in the United States
Medical and health organizations based in Pennsylvania